Choi Sung-keun (born 28 July 1991) is a South Korean footballer, who plays as a midfielder for Suwon Samsung Bluewings.

References

J. League (#13)

External links

Choi Sung-keun at Asian Games Incheon 2014
 

1991 births
Living people
Association football midfielders
South Korean footballers
South Korean expatriate footballers
J1 League players
J2 League players
Ventforet Kofu players
Sagan Tosu players
FC Gifu players
Suwon Samsung Bluewings players
Expatriate footballers in Japan
South Korean expatriate sportspeople in Japan
Footballers at the 2014 Asian Games
Asian Games medalists in football
Korea University alumni
Asian Games gold medalists for South Korea
Medalists at the 2014 Asian Games